Neodymium(III) sulfide is a inorganic chemical compound with the formula Nd2S3 composed of a two neodymium atoms in the +3 oxidation state and three sulfur atoms in the +2 oxidation state. It has a high melting point and a lot of polymorphic forms which make it difficult to grow. When heated, neodymium sulfide can lose sulfur atoms and can form a range of compositions between Nd2S3 and Nd3S4. Neodymium(III) sulfide is an electrical insulator.

Preparation

Neodymium(III) sulfide can directly be produced by reacting neodymium with sulfur:
 2Nd + 3S → Nd2S3

It can also be produced by sulfidizing neodymium oxide with H2S:
 Nd2O3 + 3 H2S → Nd2S3 + 3 H2O

See also
 Neodymium
 Sulfur
 Lanthanide

References

Neodymium compounds
Sulfides